The 1973 U.S. Women's Open was the 28th U.S. Women's Open, held July 19–22 at the Country Club of Rochester in Rochester, New York.

Defending champion Susie Berning won the third of her three U.S. Women's Open titles, five strokes ahead of runners-up Gloria Ehret and Shelley Hamlin. After a three-under 69 in the third round, Berning was the co-leader with Pam Higgins, two strokes ahead of 36-hole leader Sharon Miller.

Berning was the third of seven to successfully defend the championship, following Mickey Wright in 1959 and Donna Caponi in 1970; it was the last of her four major titles.

The championship was held at the course twenty years earlier in 1953, the first Women's Open conducted by the United States Golf Association (USGA). It was the second consecutive Women's Open played in the state of New York; the 1972 edition was at Winged Foot in Mamaroneck.

Past champions in the field

Made the cut

Source:

Missed the cut

Source:

Final leaderboard
Sunday, July 22, 1973

Source:

References

External links
Golf Observer final leaderboard
U.S. Women's Open Golf Championship
U.S. Women's Open – past champions – 1973
Country Club of Rochester

U.S. Women's Open
Golf in New York (state)
Sports competitions in New York (state)
History of Rochester, New York
Women's sports in New York (state)
U.S. Women's Open
U.S. Women's Open
U.S. Women's Open